George Thomas Morgan (November 24, 1845 – January 4, 1925) was a United States Mint engraver who is famous for designing many popular coins, such as the Morgan dollar, the reverse of the Columbian Exposition half dollar, and the reverse of the McKinley Birthplace Memorial gold dollar.

Biography
Morgan was born in Birmingham, England where he worked for many years as a die engraver. He came to the United States in 1876 and was hired as an assistant engraver at the Mint in October under William Barber.  He figured very prominently in the production of pattern coins from 1877 onward, and designed several varieties of 1877 half dollars, the 1879 "Schoolgirl" dollar, and the 1882 "Shield Earring" coins. He became the seventh Chief Engraver of the United States Mint following the death of Charles E. Barber in February 1917. 

Morgan is most famous for designing the Morgan dollar, one of many namesakes, as well as the never-released $100 Gold Union coin.

References

External links 
 

1845 births
1925 deaths
American people of Welsh descent
United States Mint engravers
People from Birmingham, West Midlands